Kareem Alexander Brown (born January 30, 1983) is a former American football defensive tackle who retired in 2011. He was drafted by the New England Patriots in the fourth round of the 2007 NFL Draft.  He played college football at the University of Miami.

Brown was also a member of the New York Jets, New York Giants, and Tennessee Titans.

Professional career

New England Patriots
After being drafted by the Patriots, he spent eleven weeks on the team before being waived in week 11 of the 2007 NFL season.

New York Jets
The Jets claimed him off waivers in week 11 of 2007 season. He was inactive for four games with the Jets before making his NFL debut versus Kansas City on December 30, 2007.  He was inactive for the first seven games of the 2008 regular season with the Jets before being waived. He spent the remainder of the 2008 season on the Jets' practice squad. The Jets attempted to convert Brown from defensive end to tight end for 2009,
 but ultimately released him September 5.

New York Giants
Brown was signed to the New York Giants practice squad on September 7, 2009. He was released on September 15, 2009.

Tennessee Titans
Brown was signed to the Tennessee Titans' practice squad on December 17, 2009. After his contract expired at the end of the season, Brown was re-signed on January 5, 2010. He was released on July 28, 2011.

Coaching career
In 2013, Brown became a member of the coaching staff of the Miami Hurricanes, his alma mater, serving first as a defensive line graduate assistant and then as director of player development/defense.

References

External links
Miami Hurricanes bio
Tennessee Titans bio

1983 births
Living people
Miami Norland Senior High School alumni
Players of American football from Miami
American football defensive tackles
American football defensive ends
American football tight ends
FIU Panthers football coaches
Miami Hurricanes football coaches
Miami Hurricanes football players
New England Patriots players
New York Jets players
New York Giants players
Tennessee Titans players
Sports coaches from Miami